Long Gone is a metal-edged, guitar blues album released in 1997 by Jimmy D. Lane.

Track listing
  "Hear My Train a Comin'"
  "Obsession Babies"
  "Long Gone"
  "I Shall Be Released" 
 "Shake, Shiver, Ache" 
  "Rollin' Stone"
  "Whiskey"
  "Boom Boom"
  "White Tears"
  "Oh What a Feelin'"
  "California"
  "I'm in Love"
  "Tears Without a Shoulder"

References

1997 albums